The 1896 United States presidential election in South Dakota took place on November 3, 1896. All contemporary 45 states were part of the 1896 United States presidential election. Voters chose four electors to the Electoral College, which selected the president and vice president.

South Dakota was won by the Populist nominees, former U.S. Representative William Jennings Bryan of Nebraska and his running mate Arthur Sewall of Maine. Two electors cast their vice presidential ballots for Thomas E. Watson.

Bryan won the state by a very narrow margin of 0.22 percentage points, becoming the first national Democratic presidential candidate to win the state. Bryan would later lose the state to Republican incumbent president William McKinley four years later and would later lose the state again to William Howard Taft in 1908. The state would not vote Democratic again until 1932. As of the 2020 election, this is the only time that a Republican candidate has won the presidency without carrying South Dakota.

Results

Results by county

See also
 United States presidential elections in South Dakota

Notes

References

South Dakota
1896
1896 South Dakota elections